Vera Alida Bergkamp  (born 1 June 1971) is a Dutch politician. A member of the Democrats 66 (D66) party, she has been a member of the House of Representatives since 20 September 2012. On 7 April 2021, she was elected Speaker of the House of Representatives.

Early life and education 
Bergkamp was born in Amsterdam to a Dutch mother and a Moroccan father. At the age of 20, she adopted her mother's surname, because her father's surname was too difficult to write and to pronounce. Bergkamp studied human resource management at the Amsterdam University of Applied Sciences. She also holds a master's degree in public administration and political science from the Vrije Universiteit Amsterdam.

Career 
From 2008 to 2012, Bergkamp was the director of the human resources department of the Social Insurance Bank (SVB), a Dutch quango responsible for administering national insurance schemes. From 2010 to 2012, she chaired the LGBT rights organisation COC Nederland, as well as held a seat in the district council of Amsterdam-Centrum.

In the 2012 general election, Bergkamp was elected into the House of Representatives as a member of D66. She was re-elected in 2017 and 2021. On 7 April 2021, she succeeded Khadija Arib as Speaker of the House of Representatives.

Personal life 
Bergkamp is openly lesbian. She is married and has two children.

See also 
 2021 Speaker of the Dutch House of Representatives election

References

External links 
 Profile at Parlement.com 
 

1971 births
Living people
21st-century Dutch women politicians
21st-century Dutch politicians
Democrats 66 politicians
Dutch columnists
Dutch human resource management people
Dutch people of Moroccan descent
Dutch political consultants
Lesbian politicians
LGBT members of the Parliament of the Netherlands
Dutch LGBT rights activists
Dutch lesbian writers
Members of the House of Representatives (Netherlands)
Municipal councillors of Amsterdam-Centrum
Speakers of the House of Representatives (Netherlands)
Vrije Universiteit Amsterdam alumni
Dutch women columnists
Writers from Amsterdam
20th-century Dutch women
20th-century Dutch LGBT people
21st-century Dutch LGBT people